The timeline of the Molotov–Ribbentrop Pact is a chronology of events, including Molotov–Ribbentrop Pact negotiations, leading up to, culminating in, and resulting from the Molotov–Ribbentrop Pact. The Treaty of Non-aggression between Nazi Germany and the Soviet Union was signed in the early hours of August 24, 1939, but was dated August 23.

Prelude 

 3 March 1918: The peace treaty of Brest-Litovsk between Soviet Russia and the Central Powers signed.
 11 November 1918: The armistice between the Allies and Germany ends the First World War on the Western Front. After Germany's collapse, British, French and Japanese troops intervene in the Russian Civil War.
 28 June 1919: The Treaty of Versailles formally ends the First World War. 
 16 April 1922: The Treaty of Rapallo between Germany and Soviet Russia renounces all territorial and financial claims against the other. A secret annex allows Germany to train its military in Soviet territory.
 24 April 1926: The Treaty of Berlin between the Soviet Union and Germany signed, guaranteeing neutrality in the event of an attack on the other by a third party. A renewal is signed in 1931, ratified in 1933.
 28 September 1926: The Soviet–Lithuanian Non-Aggression Pact signed.
 21 January 1932: The Soviet–Finnish Non-Aggression Pact signed.
 5 February 1932: The Soviet–Latvian Non-Aggression Pact signed.
 4 May 1932: The Soviet–Estonian Non-Aggression Pact signed.
 25 July 1932: The Soviet–Polish Non-Aggression Pact signed.
 30 January 1933:  Adolf Hitler comes to power.
 26 January 1934: The German–Polish Non-Aggression Pact signed.
 2 May 1935: The Franco-Soviet Treaty of Mutual Assistance signed.
 18 June 1935: The Anglo-German Naval Agreement signed.
 25 November 1936: The Anti-Comintern Pact signed between Nazi Germany and the Empire of Japan. The pact is against the Communist International in general, and the Soviet Union in particular.
 12 March 1938: Germany annexes Austria in the Anschluss.
 29 September 1938: The Munich Agreement permits German annexation of Czechoslovakia's Sudetenland.
 15–16 March 1939: Germany invades Czechoslovakia; the Protectorate of Bohemia and Moravia is established.

Diplomacy in 1939 

 10 March 1939: Stalin's speech to the Eighteenth Party Congress.  
 March 1939: Tripartite talks begin between the Soviet Union, United Kingdom and France.
 31 March 1939: United Kingdom and France offer guarantees of independence to Poland, Belgium, Romania, Greece, and Turkey.
 28 April 1939: Hitler denounces the 1934 German–Polish Non-Aggression Pact and the 1935 Anglo-German Naval Agreement.
 3 May 1939: Stalin replaces Foreign Minister Maxim Litvinov with Vyacheslav Molotov.
 22 May 1939: The Pact of Steel (the Pact of Friendship and Alliance between Germany and Italy) signed.
 7 June 1939: The German–Estonian Non-Aggression Pact and the German–Latvian Non-Aggression Pact signed.
 19 August 1939: The German–Soviet Commercial Agreement signed.
 23/24 August 1939: The Molotov–Ribbentrop Pact signed.

Aftermath 

 25 August 1939: The Anglo-Polish military alliance signed.
 1 September 1939: Germany invades Poland.
 3 September 1939: United Kingdom and France declare war on Germany
 17 September 1939: The Soviet Union invades Poland.
 28 September 1939: The German–Soviet Treaty of Friendship, Cooperation and Demarcation signed.
 29 September 1939: The Soviet–Estonian Mutual Assistance Treaty signed.
 5 October 1939: The Soviet–Latvian Mutual Assistance Treaty signed. 
 10 October 1939: The Soviet–Lithuanian Mutual Assistance Treaty signed.
 30 November 1939: The Soviets troops assault Finland, starting the Winter War, lasting 105 days.
 12 March 1940: The Moscow Peace Treaty between the Soviet Union and Finland signed.
 June–August 1940: The Soviet Union occupies and annexes the Baltic states.
 28 June 1940: The Soviet Union occupies Bessarabia and Northern Bukovina.
 27 September 1940: The Tripartite Pact between Germany, Italy and Japan signed.
 12–15 November 1940: Molotov's visit to Berlin.
 13 April 1941: The Soviet–Japanese Neutrality Pact signed.
 22 June 1941: Germany assaults the Soviet Union.

See also 
Timeline of the occupation of the Baltic states
Timeline of the Winter War

Notes

Chronology of World War II
Molotov–Ribbentrop Pact